Virginia's 36th Senate district is one of 40 districts in the Senate of Virginia. It has been represented by Democrat Scott Surovell since 2016, succeeding retiring fellow Democrat Toddy Puller.

Geography
District 36 covers parts of Fairfax, Prince William, and Stafford Counties in Northern Virginia, including some or all of Hybla Valley, Fort Hunt, Mount Vernon, Woodlawn, Fort Belvoir, Groveton, Hayfield, Lorton, Newington, Mason Neck, Woodbridge, Dale City, Marumsco, Neabsco, Montclair, Dumfries, Triangle, Quantico, and Cherry Hill.

The district overlaps with Virginia's 1st, 8th, and 11th congressional districts, and with the 2nd, 28th, 31st, 42nd, 43rd, 44th, 51st, and 52nd districts of the Virginia House of Delegates. It lies directly across the Potomac River from the state of Maryland.

Recent election results

2019

2015

2011

Federal & Statewide results in District 36

Historical results
All election results below took place prior to 2011 redistricting, and thus were under different district lines.

2007

2003

1999

1995

District officeholders

References

Virginia Senate districts
Government in Fairfax County, Virginia
Prince William County, Virginia
Stafford County, Virginia